The 1732 Irpinia earthquake was a seismic event with a magnitude of 6.6 that affected Irpinia and part of Sannio. It occurred on 29 November 1732 at 8:40 AM local time (UTC+1). The epicenter was located in the Campanian Apennines, in the area of the Ufita Valley, which is part of the modern-day Province of Avellino. Around twenty populated areas were destroyed entirely or in part and tens of others were significantly damaged. The number of deaths was estimated to be 1,940. Damage from the earthquake was classified as "severe" (indicating damage between $5 and US$24 million), and the number of homes destroyed as classified as "many" (indicating between 101 and 1,000 homes). The earthquake had a rating on the modified Mercalli intensity scale of X (extreme).

Among the most devastated communities were Mirabella Eclano (which was razed to the ground), Carife, Grottaminarda, and Ariano Irpino. Damage was serious in the provincial capital of Avellino, while in Benevento, there were mainly partial collapses of buildings.

See also 

 List of historical earthquakes
 List of earthquakes in Italy

References 

1732 earthquakes
1732 in Italy
Earthquakes in Italy
History of Campania